Éterpigny is the name of two communes in France:
 Éterpigny, Pas-de-Calais
 Éterpigny, Somme